Liu Zhengrong (刘正荣) is the deputy chief of the Internet Affairs Bureau of the People's Republic of China.

References

Living people
Year of birth missing (living people)
Chinese government officials
Place of birth missing (living people)